The 1908 bombardment of the Majlis of Iran took place on 23 June 1908 in Tehran, during the Iranian Constitutional Revolution, when the Persian Cossack forces, commanded by Vladimir Liakhov and other Russian officers, bombarded and suppressed the Iranian parliament, the Majlis.

History

Mohammad Ali Shah Qajar, the Shah of Persia, who ascended the throne in January 1907 opposed the constitution of 1906, which was ratified during regime of his father Mozzafar-al-Din Shah. After his ascension, in August 1907 an Anglo-Russian agreement divided Iran into a Russian zone in the North, a British zone in the South, and a neutral zone in the center. The British switched their support to the Shah, abandoning the Constitutionalists.
The Shah later tried to subdue and eliminate the Majles with the military and political support of Russia and Britain. 

During the constitutional revolution, the Shah confined himself to his residence at the Bagh-e Shah fort in the west of Tehran. He enlisted the help of the Cossack Brigade to control the revolution, leaving the city of Tehran at their mercy. The loyalty of the Cossack Brigade was fully guaranteed, not only by the previous purge carried out by commander Vladimir Liakhov, but also by the king's distribution of a special bonus in 1908.

Russian colonel Vladimir Liakhov, the commander of the Cossack Brigade, led the force in shelling the Majles and executing several leaders of the Constitutional Movement on June 23, 1908. His forces then plundered the parliament and damaged the building. This event lead to the beginning of a period known as the "Minor Tyranny." Liakhov was subsequently made Military Governor of Tehran by the Shah, transforming the city into a military garrison.

However, in July 1909, pro-Constitution forces marched from Iran's province of Azerbaijan to Tehran. They were able to capture Tehran, depose the Shah and re-establish the constitution. Colonel Liakhov and his forces served the Shah until July 1909, when the Shah abdicated and fled to Russia, resulting in the surrender of Liakhov and the Persian Cossack Brigade. Liakhov was pardoned by the Constitutional leaders probably for the fear of a Russian attack and was sent back to Saint Petersburg, where he would be dismissed soon after to serve in the Caucasus campaign of the First World War.

Gallery

See also
Triumph of Tehran

References 

Persian Constitutional Revolution
History of Tehran
Conflicts in 1908
History of civil rights and liberties in Iran
Mass murder in 1908
1908 in Iran
1908 in the Russian Empire
Iran–Russia relations
Military coups in Iran
1st term of the Iranian Majlis
1900s coups d'état and coup attempts